Pancharevo Gorge (Pancharevo saddle) is a deep and narrow gorge in the upper stream of the Iskar River in western Bulgaria. It is sandwiched between the mountains of Vitosha and Plana to the southwest and the Lozen Mountain to the northeast. The gorge forms the boundary between Samokov and Sofia valleys. Its average altitude is 700 m. The villages of Pancharevo, Kokalyane and Dolni Pasarel also located in the gorge. In the narrowest part of the gorge Iskar River makes a meander in which right beach is located Urvich medieval fortress, and in the left - Kokalyane monastery. In the gorge are situated the Pancharevo Lake and the Pasarel Reservoir.

Canyons and gorges of Bulgaria
Landforms of Sofia Province
Landforms of Sofia City Province